Michael Anthony Mahoney-Johnson (born 6 November 1976) is an English former professional footballer who played in the Football League for Queens Park Rangers, Brighton & Hove Albion and Wycombe Wanderers.

Mahoney-Johnson played no League football after injuring his knee in a friendly match between QPR and the Jamaica national team in March 1998. He scored two League goals, both in a 6–3 defeat away to Peterborough United while on loan to Wycombe Wanderers.

References

1976 births
Living people
Footballers from Paddington
English footballers
Association football forwards
Queens Park Rangers F.C. players
Wycombe Wanderers F.C. players
Brighton & Hove Albion F.C. players
Chesham United F.C. players
English Football League players